Battle Chasers is an American fantasy comic book series by Joe Madureira, launched in April 1998. It was characterized by scheduling problems, with an average of about six months between issues, including a delay of 16 months for issue #7. Madureira produced a total of nine issues in four years (publishing two to three a year), a pace for which he was criticized.

Originally published by WildStorm under its Cliffhanger imprint (founded by Madureira with J. Scott Campbell and Humberto Ramos), the series moved to Image Comics in 2001.

The last issue, #9, was published in August 2001 and had a cliffhanger ending that was never concluded, as #10 (scheduled for November 2001) was not released for over 20 years; Joe Madureira left the comic industry to pursue a career as a video game designer. In February 2023, Image Comics announced a planned release of issue #10, scheduled for June of that year.

Publication history
Battle Chasers was one of the initial three comic book series published under the Cliffhanger label, which Madureira founded with fellow artists J. Scott Campbell (Danger Girl) and Humberto Ramos (Crimson) for Jim Lee's Image Comics imprint, WildStorm. When, effective in 1999, Wildstorm was sold to DC Comics, the Cliffhanger titles moved along, and issues 5 through 8 of Battle Chasers were published by DC, until Madureira left the publisher, and released Battle Chasers #9 through Image Comics. Madureira canceled Battle Chasers #10, and placed the series "on hold" after forming a game development company called Tri-Lunar with Tim Donley and Greg Peterson.

When it was announced in August 2005 that Madureira would return to the comic industry, working on a then-unspecified project with Jeph Loeb for Marvel Comics (which was later revealed to be The Ultimates 3), he also stated that a conclusion to Battle Chasers is "one of those things that I think about every once in a while, and not having finished it bums me out… I would love to do it at some point, but it would be very far out." Joe Madureira said that he planned to release issue #10, starting directly where issue #9 ended, and two more issues as part of a 3-part story arc some time after the release of Battle Chasers: Nightwar in October 2017. After several years of further delays, he posted unlettered preview pages to Twitter in March 2021. Nearly two more years passed before, at the end of February 2023, Image Comics announced a planned release date for June of 2023, featuring a new story arc and art by Lullabi.

Overview
The story takes place in an "arcanepunk" setting. The story stars five main characters, including a ten-year-old girl named Gully, whose father mysteriously vanishes, leaving behind a pair of magical gloves. A rogue named Red Monika tries to enlist Garrison, a swordsman haunted by the death of his wife, to assist in freeing a prisoner, which Garrison turns down. Red Monika accidentally releases four extremely powerful villains during the breakout. Garrison overcomes his grief and joins Gully, the wizard Knolan, and the towering war golem Calibretto to stop the villains' rampage.

Characters
Garrison
At the beginning of the series, Garrison is drunk in despair with the passing of his wife. He is a legendary swordsman and owns a powerful magical sword. Trained in swordplay by Red Monika and mentored by Aramus. From Joe's original concept sketches of the characters, Garrison's sword was able to open similar to the Thundercats' Sword of Omens.

Gully
Gully is a ten-year-old girl whose father, Aramus, mysteriously vanishes leaving a powerful set of magical gloves behind. Through the series she shares a friendship with Calibretto and Knolan while searching for her father.

Calibretto
An outlawed war golem with a very gentle personality. The last of his kind after all previous war golems were ordered to be destroyed. His arms can fire projectiles.

Knolan
A powerful wizard, approximately five hundred years old, who takes Gully under his wing. His companion is Calibretto, a war golem.

Red Monika
A voluptuous bounty hunter who originally trained Garrison, and has an apparent history with him. Joe's concept sketch notes refer to her as "sort of the Jessica Rabbit of the Battle Chasers world".

Reception
Although issue 10 of Battle Chasers was not released, it was 14th in the Top 300 comics list with an estimated pre-order of 60,860.

Film adaptation
In March 2003, Twentieth Century Fox optioned feature rights to the fantasy comic book series with Gil Netter attached to produce. Stuart Hazeldine was considered to adapt the screenplay.

Issues

Core issues
 Battle Chasers Prelude (1998, Image Comics/Wildstorm)
 Story in Frank Frazetta Fantasy Illustrated #2 (1998, Quantum Cat Entertainment)
 Battle Chasers #1–4 (1998, Image Comics/Wildstorm)
 Battle Chasers #5–8 (1999–2001, DC Comics/Wildstorm)
 Battle Chasers #9 (2001, Image Comics)

Reprints
 Battle Chasers: Collected Edition #1 (reprints Battle Chasers #1–2)
 Battle Chasers: Collected Edition #2 (reprints Battle Chasers #3–4)
 Battle Chasers: A Gathering of Heroes (reprints Battle Chasers #1–5, the Prelude and the story from Frank Frazetta Fantasy Illustrated #2)
 Battle Chasers Anthology HC (reprints #0-9; and a few sketches and pages of the unprinted issues 10) release April 26, 2011.

Battle Chasers: Nightwar

On September 9, 2015, Madureira started a 30-day Kickstarter campaign for a turn-based role-playing game called Battle Chasers: Nightwar that serves as a continuation and jumping-on point of the original comic book series. The game is being developed by Airship Syndicate and published by THQ Nordic. Madureira will be the CEO and Creative Director along with Ryan Stefanelli as President and Lead Designer; Steve Madureira as Animation Director; Christopher Brooks as Technical Director and Jesse Carpenter as Environment Lead. 2D animation scenes in the game will be developed by Powerhouse Animation Studios. Nightwar is currently planned for release on PC and Mac, both on Steam and DRM-free on GoG, Xbox One and PlayStation 4 versions were eventually added as core goals. It was also confirmed for the Nintendo Switch in a Nintendo Direct in April 2017. In addition to this, new issues of the Battle Chasers comic book will be published and released digitally with pledges starting at $90 and higher.

Calibretto also had been announced as a playable character in the game Indivisible before the dissolution of developer Lab Zero Games.

References

1998 comics debuts
Image Comics titles
Fantasy comics
Steampunk comics
Unfinished comics